Endel Edasi (4 June 1929 – 4 April 2002) was an Estonian swimmer who represented the Soviet Union in men's 100 metre freestyle swimming at the 1952 Summer Olympics.

References

1929 births
2002 deaths
Estonian male freestyle swimmers
Soviet male freestyle swimmers
Olympic swimmers of the Soviet Union
Swimmers at the 1952 Summer Olympics
Swimmers from Tallinn